Wirehead is an interactive movie developed by the Code Monkeys for the Sega CD, and published by Sega and MGM Interactive in 1995.

Wirehead was one of the last games released for the Sega CD, and one of the platform's most ambitious full-motion video productions. A Sega 32X CD port was planned, but was canceled.

Gameplay 
Ned Hubbard (Steve Witting) is a mild-mannered family man who just happens to have a wireless device implanted into his brain. When strange men attempt to kidnap Ned from his home, he flees for his life. The player guides Ned by manipulating his brain–computer interface. Every few seconds, the player must react quickly to an audiovisual prompt, and guide Ned in one of three or four possible directions. In most cases, one option advances the game, and the others lead to Ned's downfall. Although Ned's evasive manoeuvres are almost invariably non-violent, a few circumstances instigate "combat mode", in which the player has two attack options: punch or kick.

References

External links 
 Wirehead at DefunctGames. Retrieved 7 January 2014.

1995 video games
Cyberpunk video games
Full motion video based games
Interactive movie video games
MGM Interactive games
North America-exclusive video games
Sega video games
Sega CD games
Sega CD-only games
Video games developed in the United Kingdom